Journey to the End of the Night is a 2006 independent crime thriller film directed by Eric Eason starring Brendan Fraser, Mos Def, Scott Glenn, Alice Braga and Catalina Sandino Moreno.

Premise 
In a dark and decadent area of São Paulo, Brazil, exiled Americans Sinatra and his son Paul own a brothel. Paul is a compulsive gambler addicted to cocaine. Sinatra is married to a former prostitute named Angie, with whom he has a son.

A Russian client is killed by his wife in their establishment, leaving behind a suitcase filled with drugs. On the night that they have scheduled a negotiation to sell the contents of the suitcase to African buyers, their go-between dies while having sex with a trans woman named Nazda. In desperation, Sinatra makes a deal with the Nigerian dishwasher of the brothel, Wemba, who is to travel to the harbor of Santos, taking the place of the go-between, and make the sale to the drug dealers. In return, Wemba would receive a large amount of money.

Wemba accepts but, while returning to his car in the harbor, he is attacked by two small-time thieves and knocked unconscious. His lack of contact with Sinatra and Paul starts a chain-reaction of misunderstandings that lead to a tragic end.

Cast
Brendan Fraser – Paul 
Mos Def – Wemba
Scott Glenn – Sinatra
Alice Braga – Monique
Catalina Sandino Moreno – Angie
Ruy Polanah – The Soothsayer
Matheus Nachtergaele – Nazda
Gilson Adalberto Gomes – Samy
Milhem Cortaz – Rodrigo
Luke Denis Nolan – Lazare

Legacy
After seeing portions of Fraser's performance in the trailer of Journey to the End of the Night, Darren Aronofsky reportedly cast him in the leading role of The Whale (2022), which has  widely been cited as Fraser's comeback film.

References

External links

2006 films
2006 crime thriller films
2006 independent films
2006 thriller drama films
American crime thriller films
American thriller drama films
Brazilian crime thriller films
Brazilian independent films
Films about father–son relationships
Films set in São Paulo
German crime thriller films
German independent films
English-language Brazilian films
English-language German films
Films about dysfunctional families
Films about prostitution in Brazil
Films shot in São Paulo
Films scored by Elia Cmíral
2006 drama films
2000s American films
2000s German films